The Gown is the student newspaper at Queen's University, Belfast, Northern Ireland. It was formed by Richard Herman, a medical student, in April 1955. In 2005 Dr. Herman attended the paper's 50th Anniversary.

The paper is run voluntarily by students, and is funded by advertising without University or Students' Union assistance, although it is located in the Union building.

History
During the Troubles, the 30 years of  political violence in Northern Ireland, the newspaper covered the deaths of local MP Robert Bradford and the murder of Queen's university lecturer and Assembly member Edgar Graham in 1983.  The paper also interviewed Gerry Adams, leader of Sinn Féin during the height of the Provisional Irish Republican Army's campaign. The Gown also interviewed the then little-known band U2.

Past contributors include Mark Carruthers and Maggie Taggart of BBC Northern Ireland, Henry McDonald of The Observer, radio and television presenter Nick Ross, journalist Eamonn McCann, Irish Times foreign correspondent Conor O'Clery and that paper's political cartoonist Martyn Turner.

In February 2010, standing news editor Lorcan Mullen published in The Guardian an article concerning a leaked NI government report regarding university fees.

References

External links

Newspapers published in Northern Ireland
Clubs and societies of Queen's University Belfast
Mass media in Belfast
Student newspapers published in the United Kingdom
Newspapers established in 1955
Free newspapers
1955 establishments in Northern Ireland